Rush is an Australian television police drama that first screened on Network Ten in September 2008. Set in Melbourne, Victoria, it focuses on the members of a Police Tactical Response team. It is produced by John Edwards and Mimi Butler for Endemol Australia, which was branded as the Southern Star Group during production of the series.

In late October 2011, text phrasing on the cover art of Entertainment One's DVD release of the fourth series first indicated Rush would not return for another series, meaning series four would be its last. Soon after, the production company, known at the time as the Southern Star Group confirmed with TV Tonight that a fifth series had not been commissioned. Network Ten did not issue any press releases stating the wrapping up of Rush. Executive Producer of Drama and Production at Network Ten, Rick Maier, issued a statement on the show's official Facebook page: "While we don't discount a return series, it is not on the cards at this stage – but we do intend to finish season four with a bang, literally."

Plot
Rush follows the lives of members of the prestigious Tactical Response team (TR), which is based on the real life Victoria Police Critical Incident Response Team, a highly mobile unit that fills the operational gap between general duties police and the SWAT-like Special Operations Group. The team is seen responding to violent incidents such as carjackings, suicides and armed offences.

Most of the episodes involve at least one main plot, with one or two smaller subplots throughout each episode. In some cases, they will focus on one plot, while the personal lives tend to fall into the form of smaller subplots that span over a number of episodes. Usually the team is divided into two, one team per case, with the team taking the minor subplot meeting up with the major team at some stage throughout the episode. The usual six-person team is split between two vehicles known as TR01 and TR02.

In series four, the composition of the plot was revamped with only one large and extensive arc featured throughout the 13 episodes, as opposed to the story-line structure of prior series.

Production
The pilot for Rush, originally titled Rapid Response, was filmed in 2004 and based on an earlier Police Rescue script. The pilot featured several characters and cast who did not return for the series, including Matthew Le Nevez, Libby Tanner and Corinne Grant. The series was initially rejected but years later was picked up for production when the 2007–2008 Writers Guild of America strike affected Ten's imported shows.

Sergeant Dominic "Dom" Wales, played by Josef Ber, was originally scripted to be killed in the first season, however during production Van der Boom asked to be released. Her US working visa had been approved and being a "Residency Visa", required her to move to the US. As such, the character of Grace was killed off instead. Jolene Anderson joined the cast for the second series, from 16 July 2009. The series is filmed in Victoria in both regional and metropolitan areas.

A third season of Rush was announced by Channel Ten on 25 September 2009. It premiered in the time-slot of 8:30pm on 22 July 2010.

A thirteen-episode fourth season was confirmed by Channel Ten's Executive Producer of Drama and Production, Rick Maier on 12 November 2010. He stated "Rush continues to deliver great stories, great stunts and some of the best performances on TV". Filming for the fourth season began on 6 May 2011.

Cast

Main cast

Guest cast
 Camille Keenan as Audrey Khoo; police intelligence officer (Series 3; 15 episodes)
 Jane Allsop as Tash Button; love interest of Brendan Joshua (Series 3–4; 12 episodes)
 Emily Wheaton as Amber Cushing; niece and assistant of Leon Broznic (Series 4; 9 episodes)
 Elena Mandalis as Anna Vargis; police minister (Series 4; 8 episodes)
 Asher Keddie as Jacinta Burns; journalist and love interest of Lawson Blake (Series 2; 7 episodes)
 Ella-Rose Shenman as Minka Button; daughter of Tash Button (Series 3–4; 6 episodes)
 Todd MacDonald as Connor Barry; husband of Grace Barry (Series 1; 6 episodes)
 Nathaniel Dean as Andrew Kronin; career criminal and nemesis of Lawson Blake (Series 2–3; 5 episodes)
 Paul Ireland as Boyd Kemper; brother of hit-and-run victim and love interest of Kerry Vincent (Series 2; 5 episodes)
 Ian Meadows as James Vincent; drug addict and son of Kerry Vincent (Series 3–4; 5 episodes)
 Maia Thomas as Sandrine Wales; wife of Dominic Wales (Series 1–2; 4 episodes)
 Kate Jenkinson as Nina Wise; love interest of Leon Broznic (Series 1–2; 4 episodes)
 Peter Hardy as Doug Rainey; head of a notorious crime family (Series 4; 4 episodes)
 Malcolm Kennard as Col Rainey; son of Doug Rainey (Series 4; 3 episodes)
 Mark Leonard Winter as Liam Rainey; son of Doug Rainey and brother of Col Rainey (Series 4; 3 episodes)
 Nikki Shiels as Cleo Temple; journalist and love interest of Stella Dagostino (Series 4; 3 episodes)
 Zed Ledden as Brian Marshall (Series 1–2; 3 episodes)

Episodes

Home media

Home media

Online Streaming
Original Broadcast on Tenplay (2008-2012)

Re-Release Broadcast On Tenplay (2019–Present)

Note: The Rush Web Extras were NOT add back with The Re-Release on 10play.

Awards and achievements

International broadcasters

See also
 List of Australian television series

References

External links
 Rush at the Australian Television Information Archive
 
 

2008 Australian television series debuts
2011 Australian television series endings
Network 10 original programming
2000s Australian drama television series
2000s Australian crime television series
Television shows set in Melbourne
Television series by Endemol Australia
2000s police procedural television series
English-language television shows
2010s Australian drama television series
2010s Australian crime television series
2010s police procedural television series